This article has an incomplete list of notable and prominent Hindus from Bangladesh.

Politics 

 Comrade Moni Sinha, founding General Secretary of Bangladesh Communist Party
 Pulin De
 Chitta Ranjan Dutta
 Trailokyanath Chakravarty
 Gopal Krishna Maharatna
 Suranjit Sengupta
 Joya Sengupta

Current ministers 

 Sadhan Chandra Majumder, Minister of Food
 Swapan Bhattacharjee, Minister of State for Local Government, Rural Development and Co-operatives

Current members of Jatiya Sangsad 
Current 11th Jatiya Sangsad has 18 Hindu MP.

 Jaya Sengupta, Sunamganj, (from Awami League)
 Ramesh Chandra Sen
 Manoranjan Shill Gopal
 Biren Sikder
 Mrinal Kanti Das
 Dipankar Talukdar
 Dhirendra Debnath Shambhu
 Pankaj Nath

Justice 

 Surendra Kumar Sinha, 21st Chief Justice of Bangladesh
 Krishna Debnath, justice of the High Court Division
 Gobinda Chandra Tagore, justice of the High Court Division
 Bhabani Prasad Singha, justice of the High Court Division
 Ashish Ranjan Daash, justice of the High Court Division
 Bhishmadev Chakrabortty, justice of the High Court Division

Sports 

 Brojen Das, swimming
 Alok Kapali, cricket
 Tapash Baishya, cricket
 Dhiman Ghosh, cricket
 Soumya Sarkar, cricket
 Liton Das, cricket
 Shuvagata Hom, cricket
 Pinak Ghosh, cricket
 Rony Talukdar, cricket
Jony Talukdar, cricket
 Debabrata Barua, cricket
 Narayan Chandra, cricket
 Taposh Ghosh, cricket
 Sumon Saha, cricket
 Sanjit Saha, cricket
 Subashis Roy, cricket
 Pritom Kumar,Cricket
 Biplob Bhattacharjee, football
 Rajani Kanta Barman, football
 Mithun Chowdhury, football
 Topu Barman, football
 Bishwanath Ghosh,Football 
Kesto Kumar Bose, football
Krishna Rani Sarkar, football
Sushanto Tripura, football
Ashim Kumar Das, archery
Beauty Roy, archery
Ram Krishna Saha, archery
 Kochi Rani Mondal, kabaddi
Asim Gope, hockey

Music 

 Subir Nandi, singer
 Tapan Chowdhury, band singer
 Sudhin Das, Nazrul Sangeet Artist and Swaralipikar
 Shuvro Dev, singer
 Rathindranath Roy, singer
 Kumar Bishwajit, pop singer
 Ustad Barin Mazumder, classical singer
 Bappa Mazumder, singer, and son of Ustad Barin Mazumder
 Sanjeeb Chowdhury, singer
 Ajit Roy, Rabindra Sangeet singer
 Bijoy Sarkar, music composer and singer
 Haimanti Rakshit Das
 Pantho Kanai
 Alaka Das, Classical Music Artist
 Shayan Chowdhury Arnob (Father is Hindu & mother is Muslim)
 Ritu Raj
 Rahul Anand
 Ripon Kumar Sarkar (Boga)
 Anima Roy, Rabindra Sangeet
 Animes Roy, Folk Singer

Cinema 

 Amalendu Biswas
 Animesh Aich, director
 Aruna Biswas
 Apu Biswas
 Aparna Ghosh
 Anju Ghosh
 Ashish Kumar Louho
 Anam Biswas
 Subhash Dutta
 Sumita Devi
 Shabnam
 Bidya Sinha Saha Mim (Actress)
 Bappy Chowdhury (Actor)
 Chitralekha Guho
 Chanchal Chowdhury (Actor)
 Dipankar Dipon (Director)
 Jayanta Chattopadhyay
 Jyotsna Biswas
 Manoj Kumar Pramanik (Actor)
 Narayan Ghosh Mita
 Prabir Mitra
 Puja Cherry Roy (Actress)
 Ramendu Majumdar

Literature and journalism 

 Nirmalendu Goon
 Arunabh Sarkar
 Bimal Guha
 Avijit Roy
 Manik Chandra Saha
 Swadesh Bose
 Kajal Bandyopadhyay
 Mahadev Saha
Shibabrata Barman (Munshigiri film is based on his novel "Mriterao Kotha Bole")

Arts 

 Shishir Bhattacharjee
 Nitun Kundu
 Partha Pratim Majumder
 Sarker Protick or Protick Sarkar
 Sunil Dhar
 Shib Narayan Das

Business 

 Ranada Prasad Saha, philanthropist, founder of Kumudini College and Kumudini Hospital at Mirzapur Upazila, Tangail)

Academic 

 Debapriya Bhattacharya, economist
 Ajoy Roy
 Kaberi Gayen
 Purabi Basu
 Narayan Chandra Saha (Chairman of NCTB)

Martyrs and Freedom Fighters in 1971 

 Dhirendranath Datta
 Jyotirmoy Guhathakurta
 Govinda Chandra Dev
 Jogesh Chandra Ghosh
 Laxman Das
 Purnendu Dastidar
 Chitta Ranjan Dutta
 Moni Singh
 Nilmoni Sarkar
 Bidhu Dashgupto
 Suranjit Sengupta
 Jagat Joity Das

Science and technology 

 Hiranmay Sen Gupta
 Dwijen Sharma
 Arun Kumar Basak
 Shuvo Roy
 Senjuti Saha
 Samir Kumar Saha
 Jagadish Chandra Bose (by birthplace)

See also 

 Hinduism in Bangladesh
 Bengali Hindus
 Lists of Hindus

References 

Hinduism-related lists
Bengali Hindus
Hinduism in Bangladesh
Lists of Hindus
Bangladeshi Hindus